Last Ninja 2: Back with a Vengeance is an action-adventure video game developed and published by System 3 for the Commodore 64, ZX Spectrum and Amstrad CPC in 1988 as a sequel to the 1987 game The Last Ninja. The Acorn Electron, BBC Micro, 1990: Amiga, Atari ST, MS-DOS and NES ports followed in 1989. The NES version of the game was named simply The Last Ninja. In 1990, the Last Ninja Remix edition of the game was re-released for 8-bit systems.

Gameplay
The player, controlling a ninja, must fight his way through various levels populated by opponents, collecting necessary items in the process. Each level depicts a different locale and is divided into several screens. The game is presented in an isometric view and the ninja can move in eight different directions and jump.

Enemies, armed with fists and various ninja weapons, wander around the levels. The ninja must fight them either bare-handed or with the weaponry he finds along the way; in either case, he has a number of blows and attacks at his disposal, as well as the ability to block. There is a special weapon, shuriken, which are thrown in a straight line rather than used for melee combat; if they strike an enemy, they will instantly kill or at least severely damage them.

Various items scattered around the levels, such as keys, a rope and a map; collecting these items and using them in a proper place is necessary for completing the game. There are also hamburgers that award an extra life when eaten.

Plot
The game continues from the aftermath of the events of The Last Ninja. With the Koga scrolls now in his possession, Armakuni has begun training a new order of shadow warriors. During a training session, he is mysteriously transported to 20th-century New York City. Torn from his own time, Armakuni must defeat the evil shogun Kunitoki once more.

Reception
Last Ninja 2 was an enormous commercial success. According to System 3's Mark Cale, 5.5 million copies were sold for the Commodore 64 version alone; at that time, the user base of the C64 was estimated at 20 million, meaning that one in four C64 owners bought the game.

It was a runner up for Game of the Year at the Golden Joystick Awards. In 2004, readers of Retro Gamer voted Last Ninja 2 as 68th top retro game.

Legacy
A sequel, Last Ninja 3 was released in 1991.

The Last Ninja Remix re-release version has an added short intro sequence, minor graphic changes and a remixed soundtrack. 

The Limited Edition of the original release included a ninja mask and a rubber shuriken (Not available with the Remix versions of the game).

In 2015 the source code of the Konix version was discovered.

References

External links

Images of Last Ninja 2 box and manual at C64Sets.com

Terry Greer (The game's artist) Last Ninja page

1988 video games
Amiga games
Action-adventure games
Activision games
Atari ST games
BBC Micro and Acorn Electron games
Commodore 64 games
DOS games
ZX Spectrum games
Video games about ninja
Nintendo Entertainment System games
Superior Software games
Video games about time travel
Virtual Console games
Video game sequels
Video games with isometric graphics
Video games developed in the United Kingdom
Video games set in 1990
Video games set in New York City
Jaleco games
Single-player video games